Automeris zephyria, the zephyr eyed silkmoth, is a species of insect in the family Saturniidae. It is found in North America.

The MONA or Hodges number for Automeris zephyria is 7749.

Subspecies
These two subspecies belong to the species Automeris zephyria:
 Automeris zephyria zephyria
 Automeris zephyria zephyriata Barnes & Benjamin

References

Further reading

 
 
 

Hemileucinae
Articles created by Qbugbot
Moths described in 1882